Education is a 2020 drama film directed by Steve McQueen and co-written by McQueen and Alastair Siddons. The film was released as part of the anthology series Small Axe on BBC One on 13 December 2020, in the Netherlands on 16 December 2020, and on Amazon Prime Video on 18 December 2020.

Cast 

 Kenyah Sandy as Kingsley Smith
 Sharlene Whyte as Agnes Smith
 Tamara Lawrance as Stephanie Smith
 Daniel Francis as Esmond Smith
 Josette Simon as Lydia Thomas
 Naomi Ackie as Hazel
 Ryan Masher as Joseph
 Jairaj Varsani as Sajid
 Tabitha Byron as Sheila
 Roshawn Hewitt as Baz
 Aiyana Goodfellow as Nina
 Nathan Moses as Ashley
 Jo Martin as Mrs. Tabitha Bartholomew
 Kate Dickie as Miss Gill
 Stewart Wright as Mr. Baines
 Jade Anouka as Mrs. Morrison
 Adrian Rawlins as Headmaster Evans
 Nigel Boyle as Mr. Hamley

Background 

Although the characters in Education are fictional, the film is based on real-life events of the 1970s, when some London councils followed an unofficial policy of transferring disproportionate numbers of black children from mainstream education to schools for the so-called "educationally subnormal". The practice was exposed by educationalist Bernard Coard in his 1971 pamphlet How the West Indian Child is Made Educationally Sub-normal in the British School System.

Reception
On review aggregator Rotten Tomatoes, the film holds an approval rating of 93% based on 29 critic reviews, with an average rating of 8.05/10. The website's critics consensus reads, "Education casts its hopeful gaze on the future, offering a simple and effective end to the Small Axe series that solidifies Steve McQueen['s] place as a master storyteller." Metacritic assigned the film a weighted average score of 88 out of 100, based on 13 critics, indicating "universal acclaim."

Peter Debruge of Variety praised Education for its "clever" approach to portraying the subtle ways in which segregation occurs in early education without "being reductive about the institution or its employees." He compared the film's "grainy, naturalistic" style to the works of Alan Clarke and Play for Today.

References

External links

2020 television films
2020 films
2020 drama films
British drama films
2020s English-language films
2020s British films
Films directed by Steve McQueen
Dyslexia in fiction